Amar Akbar Anthony is a 1977 Indian masala film directed and produced by Manmohan Desai and written by Kader Khan. The film stars an ensemble cast of Amitabh Bachchan, Vinod Khanna, Rishi Kapoor, Neetu Singh, Parveen Babi, Shabana Azmi, Nirupa Roy, Pran and Jeevan. The plot focuses on three brothers who get separated in childhood and are adopted by people of different faiths; Hinduism, Islam and Christianity. As fate would have it, the trio reunite by chance in adulthood and set out to seek revenge from the person who is responsible for their separation.

The soundtrack album was composed by Laxmikant-Pyarelal and the lyrics were written by Anand Bakshi. The film was released on 27 May 1977 and earned  at the Indian box office, becoming the highest-grossing Indian film of that year, alongside Dharam Veer and Hum Kisise Kum Naheen.

Religious tolerance became a landmark theme in Bollywood masala films, building on the masala formula pioneered a few years earlier by Nasir Hussain's Yaadon Ki Baaraat (1973). Amar Akbar Anthony also had a lasting impact on pop culture with its catchy songs, quotable one-liners, and the character of Anthony Gonsalves (played by Bachchan). It won several awards at the 25th Filmfare Awards, including Best Actor, Best Music Director and Best Editing. It was later remade in Tamil as Shankar Salim Simon (1978), in Telugu as Ram Robert Rahim (1980), and in Malayalam as John Jaffer Janardhanan (1982). In Pakistan, the film was unofficially remade in Punjabi as Akbar Amar Anthony (1978).

Plot 

Amar Akbar Anthony is the story of three brothers separated in childhood who grow up in the families of different religions respectively and fate reunites them in adulthood.

1955 

The film begins on the Independence Day of India with Kishanlal Tripathi (Pran) a poor simpleton, being released from prison who took the blame of a fatal car accident in place of his employer Robert D'Souza (Jeevan), a notorious crimelord for whom Kishanlal worked as a chauffeur, and was thus arrested by the police. Despite Robert's assurance that his family will be paid money thrice his salary after his arrest, Kishanlal is shocked to learn upon returning home that his wife Bharati Tripathi (Nirupa Roy) is suffering from tuberculosis while his three young sons are starving badly from hunger. He angrily visits Robert's mansion and blames him for his wife's illness and children's starvation, begging him to offer him some help. Instead, Robert humiliates Kishanlal at first ordering him to polish his shoes. Kishanlal polishes Robert's shoes and in return is paid a single coin. Robert then orders his gang members to kill him. However, Kishanlal fights against Robert's gang members and manages to escape from one of his cars loaded with smuggled gold bullion. He returns home to find his sons abandoned by Bharati who has left a suicide note, saying that she does not wish to live with the money he is paid by wrongdoings. 

Pursued by Robert's gang members, Kishanlal takes his sons to the Borivali National Park where he leaves them near the Mahatma Gandhi statue for safety, and drives off to outrun Robert's gang members. He and the sons are presumed dead in an exploding car accident by both the gang members and the police. Following her suicide attempt, Bharati is struck blind by a falling branch as a sign of punishment from the Gods for abandoning her sons. 

In the park, the oldest son runs behind Kishanlal's car and is hit by the car of Robert's gang members. A Hindu police officer named Superintendent Khanna (Kamal Kapoor) finds him unconscious on the streets and takes him away. The middle son leaves in search of food for his crying baby brother. A Muslim tailor named Mr. Ilahabadi (Shivraj) finds the youngest son "abandoned" and takes him in as his son. Finding himself alone, the middle son falls asleep on the steps of a Catholic church. A Christian priest named Father Gonsalves (Nazir Hussain) finds Bharati's suicide note in his pocket and adopts him, assuming that his mother abandoned him on the steps of the church. Meanwhile, Bharati is rescued and dropped off home by Mr. Ilahabadi, but is unfortunately not able to recognize her youngest son due to her lack of sight. She is devastated to learn from the police that Kishanlal and the sons died in the car accident. Kishanlal, having survived the car accident, returns to the park with Robert's gold bullion but finds his sons gone. In retaliation, he swears vengeance on Robert upon believing that he has lost his entire family.

1977 

22 years later, the three sons are now shown grown up with different names, religions and professions in Mumbai; the oldest son is now shown as a Hindu police officer named Amar Khanna (Vinod Khanna),  the youngest son is now shown as a Muslim singer of qawwali named Akbar Ilahabadi (Rishi Kapoor), and the middle son is now shown as a Christian owner of a country bar named Anthony Gonsalves (Amitabh Bachchan). As fate would have it, the trio meet each other and become friends when they donate blood to a blind flower-seller meeting with a hit-and-run accident, unaware that she is their mother Bharati. Meanwhile, Kishanlal is now shown as a wealthy crimelord as he had used the gold bullion to form his own syndicate and hire Robert's gang members, driving him out of his business and forcing a penniless Robert to work for him. At one point, Robert is made to polish Kishanlal's shoes as revenge and is given the same coin he used to taunt Kishanlal with. It is also revealed that in order to avenge his separation from his family, Kishanlal had kidnapped Robert's infant daughter and taken her in as his niece, and that she has just returned to India after studying abroad.

During a police raid on one of his hideouts, Kishanlal and his gang members are forced to leave from the place, allowing Robert to escape with a shipment of smuggled gold bullion and shoot Superintendent Khanna non-fatally in the process as he tried to arrest him. Meeting up with Robert, Anthony hides him from the police and helps him escape, unaware about his crimes. This results in Anthony being interrogated about Robert's whereabouts by both Amar and Kishanlal. He eventually feels guilty after learning from Amar that Robert shot Superintendent Khanna.

As the story unfolds, each of the protagonists find themselves falling in love; Amar falls in love with a forced crook named Lakshmi Anand (Shabana Azmi) after arresting her abusive stepmother (Nadira), Akbar falls in love with a beautiful physician named Salma Ali (Neetu Singh) whose grumpy father Taiyyab Ali (Mukri) disapproves of their relationship, and Anthony falls in love with Robert's daughter Jenny D'Souza (Parveen Babi) during a church sermon on Easter Sunday. Using the stolen gold bullion, Robert regains his position as a crimelord and hires new gang members, planning to retrieve Jenny and seek revenge from Kishanlal.

Eventually, Robert and his gang members bump into Bharati and attempt to pursue her. While trying to escape from Robert, Bharati reaches a festival hosted by Akbar honoring the Sai Baba of Shirdi where she miraculously regains her eyesight. During her visit to Akbar's house, Mr. Ilahabadi recognises her as the woman whom he had rescued from the falling branch and dropped off home 22 years ago. At this point, Bharati sees Akbar's childhood photograph and learns that he is her youngest son. After being held hostage in the hospital by Robert, Salma and Taiyyab Ali find themselves in a house fire arranged by some prostitutes who worked under Taiyyab Ali. Akbar rescues them both and a grateful Taiyyab Ali gives blessings to Akbar and Salma's relationship. Due to Salma's information, both Akbar and Amar learn that they are brothers and that Kishanlal and Bharati are their parents, having an emotional reunion with them. 

However, things take a drastic turn when Jenny's bodyguard Zebisco (Yusuf Khan) betrays her and sells her out to Robert in exchange of her hand in marriage. Father Gonsalves sees Robert and Zebisco kidnapping Jenny and tries to rescue her. Unfortunately, Robert stabs him fatally with his knife and succeeds in taking Jenny to his house. Lakshmi is also kidnapped and taken to Robert's house as hostage by her stepbrother Ranjeet Anand (Ranjeet Bedi), who happens to be one of the gang members of Robert. After learning what happened to Father Gonsalves, Anthony learns through Bharati's old suicide note that Amar and Akbar are his brothers and that Kishanlal and Bharati are his parents. 

With the knowledge that they are related and after learning the while chain of incidents, the brothers are determined to make Robert pay for his crimes. They disguise themselves as a musician, an elderly tailor and a catholic priest respectively and enter Robert's house along with Salma, who pretends to be Akbar's wife. After their dance performance, the trio reveal themselves to Robert and the gang members and fight against them all. Eventually, the police are called in at the scene by Lakshmi, Salma and Jenny and have Robert and the gang members arrested and sent to prison for their crimes. However, Bharati is distraught to learn that Kishanlal is also arrested and sent to prison by the police for his past crimes. From inside the prison, Kishanlal expresses his happiness about gaining his three long-lost sons again along with three daughters-in-law as well. He is thus released from prison by Superintendent Khanna only to let him embrace Amar, Akbar and Anthony. The film ends with the three brothers happily driving in the sunset along with their respective love interests.

Cast 

 Vinod Khanna as Amar Khanna (born Amar Tripathi); Akbar and Anthony's older brother, Lakshmi's love interest, Kishanlal and Bharati's oldest son
 Rishi Kapoor as Akbar Illahabadi (born Raju Tripathi); Amar and Anthony's younger brother, Salma's love interest, Kishanlal and Bharati's youngest son
 Amitabh Bachchan as Anthony Gonsalves (born Chhotu Tripathi); Amar's younger brother, Akbar's older brother, Jenny's love interest, Kishanlal and Bharati's middle son
 Shabana Azmi as Lakshmi Anand; Amar's love interest
 Neetu Singh as Salma Ali; Akbar's love interest, Tayyab Ali's daughter
 Parveen Babi as Jenny D'Souza; Anthony's love interest, Robert's estranged daughter 
 Nirupa Roy as Bharati Tripathi; Kishanlal's wife, Amar, Akbar and Anthony's mother
 Pran as Kishanlal Tripathi; Bharati's husband, Amar, Akbar and Anthony's father
 Jeevan as Robert D'Souza; Kishanlal's archenemy, Jenny's estranged father, Albert's twin brother
 Jeevan also portrays Albert, Robert's twin brother. 
 Yusuf Khan as Zebisco; Jenny's bodyguard
 Ranjeet as Ranjeet Anand; Lakshmi's stepbrother 
 Kamal Kapoor as Superintendent Khanna; Amar's foster father
 Shivraj as Illahabadi; Akbar's foster father
 Nazir Hussain as Father Gonsalves; Anthony's foster father

Special Appearances 
 
 Mukri as Tayyab Ali; Salma's grumpy father
 Moolchand as Pedro; Robert's acquaintance
 Helen as the girl at the airport who is sent by Kishanlal to impersonate Jenny 
 Nadira as Lakshmi's abusive stepmother 
 Pratima Devi as Lakshmi's elderly grandmother

Production

Amar Akbar Anthony has a cinematic antecedent in Yash Chopra's 1965 film Waqt, in which a father's three sons are separated from each other. Waqt also inspired the 1976 super-hit diamond jubilee Pakistani film Talash, starring Shabnam and Nadeem. However, Amar Akbar Anthony was slated to release in 1975, prior to Talash'''s release.

Prayag Raj wrote the film's screenplay, while Kader Khan wrote the dialogue.

The character of Anthony Gonsalves was named after the famous composer and teacher of the same name, whose pupils included Pyarelal (of Laxmikant–Pyarelal, the composer duo of the film) and R. D. Burman.Booth, p. 3 Director Manmohan Desai had planned for Amitabh's character to be named “Anthony Fernandes,” with Bakshi's song entitled “My Name is Anthony Fernandes.” However, the song didn't go well with Laxmikant-Pyarelal. Composer Pyarelal then recalled his famous violin teacher and suggested that the character's last name be changed to “Gonsalves.”Booth, p. 5 The nonsensical monologue preceding the "My Name Is Anthony Gonsalves" sequence was taken in part from a 1878 speech by British politician Benjamin Disraeli in reference to W. E. Gladstone.

FilmingAmar Akbar Anthony was Manmohan Desai's first film as an independent film producer. The film was shot over a month at Ranjit Studios in Mumbai. Some exterior and interior shots were filmed at the Mount Mary Church in Bandra, Mumbai and at the Don Bosco School, Wadala, Mumbai respectively. Shooting was scheduled so that the entire cast didn't have to appear together except for the climactic sequence and the title song ("Anhoni Ko Honi"), where they all perform as a group. However, the shooting went over schedule, which required Rishi Kapoor and Shabana Azmi to shoot their scenes separately so they could leave towards the end of production to work on other films.

AnalysisAmar Akbar Anthony incorporates a strong element of secularism within a Bollywood masala film. Analysts such as Virdi (2003) and Kavoori & Punathambekar (2008) opine that the themes of Desai's "magnum opus" include religious pluralism and secular nationalism. Philip Lutgendorf hints that the separation of the three children on Indian Independence Day is akin to the Partition of India. Similarly, Vijay Mishra (2013) argues that the film reaffirmed India's "liberal ethos."
 The three religions represented by the titular characters are the "pillars of the nation:" when they work together, they can restore life to their mother (represented when they donate blood during the opening title sequence) and beat any evil (symbolised by their common villain). The characters' reunion with their parents completes the nationalistic allegory, suggesting that what was lost at independence can be regained.

The film's masala style is evident in its plot and characters. According to Varia (2013), Amar Akbar Anthony was conceived as a tragedy but later incorporated many other genres. Dickson (2016) commented that the film featured a plot which would "give even Shakespeare migraines." Some authors also highlight the archetypal character of the suffering and self-sacrificing mother (Roy). However, Dinesh Raheja concludes that "ultimately, the show belongs to Amitabh Bachchan. In a tailor-made role, he has the audience in stitches. Despite his playing an implausible character, one quickly surrenders one's reservations in favour of a rollicking romp."

MusicAmar Akbar Anthony's soundtrack was composed by Laxmikant-Pyarelal, with lyrics penned by Anand Bakshi. It proved as popular and successful as the film itself. The vinyl record, released on Polydor, was the first LP that was coloured pink.

Some of the biggest names in the Indian music industry of the time provided vocals for the film's songs. Four leading playback singers Kishore Kumar, Mohammed Rafi, Mukesh and Lata Mangeshkar, sang together for the first and only occasion in their careers on "Humko Tumse Ho Gaya Hai Pyar." In this song Kishore sang for Amitabh Bachchan, Rafi sang for Rishi Kapoor, Mukesh for Vinod Khanna while Mangeshkar sang for Shabana Azmi, Neetu Singh, and Parveen Babi. The film also features a comical filmi qawwali entitled "Parda Hai Parda" ("There Is a Veil"), sung by Rafi. Other musical legends who worked on the film include Mahendra Kapoor and Shailendra Singh.

Release
The Emergency Period delayed the release of several of Manmohan Desai's films. As a result, four of Desai's films, Dharam Veer, Chacha Bhatija, Parvarish, and Amar Akbar Anthony'', were released in 1977. Incidentally, all of these would be amongst the top-grossing films of the year.

Marketing
For the film's marketing, erasers with the images of Vinod Khanna, Rishi Kapoor, and Amitabh Bachchan were sold to students. Posters, postcards, and song booklets of the film were sold in shops.  Colorful vests and metal crosses that were similar to the ones worn by Bachchan in the film achieved popularity.

Reception
The film grossed  at the Indian box office and was the highest-grossing Bollywood film at the Indian Box Office for the year 1977. It has since been regarded as one of the most iconic films of Indian cinema.

Adjusted for inflation, the film has grossed approximately 423 crores ($51 million) as of 2023.

Accolades

Bibliography

Further reading

References

External links
 

1970s Hindi-language films
1970s masala films
1977 films
Films about organised crime in India
Films directed by Manmohan Desai
Films scored by Laxmikant–Pyarelal
Films set in Mumbai
Films shot in Mumbai
Hindi films remade in other languages
Secularism in India